Bowd is a village on the outskirts of Sidmouth in Devon, England.

External links

Villages in Devon
Sidmouth